Gerard Wesseling (born 10 August 1939) is a retired Dutch road cyclist who was active between 1959 and 1965. He competed at the Olympia's Tour in 1960–62, and won the overall race in 1960, one stage in 1961, and one stage in 1962. In 1961 he also won two stages of the Tour of Tunisia.

References

1939 births
Living people
Dutch male cyclists
People from Haarlemmerliede en Spaarnwoude
Cyclists from North Holland